Stefano Ricci  is a private family-owned Italian luxury lifestyle brand with headquarters located in Fiesole. With 60 monobrand boutiques worldwide, the brand produces menswear and accessories, a line for juniors "SR Junior", homeware "SR HOME" and lifestyle products. The brand also offers bespoke and interior design services for both yachts and residences. Stefano Ricci S.p.A. was rated as EE (average) by the London-based Standard Ethics agency for three consecutive years 2015, 2016, and 2017. The New York Times calls Stefano Ricci  "clothier to the 0.001 percent".

Stefano Ricci S.p.A. employs over 500 people worldwide, and the 9000 square metre headquarters consist of office and production facilities. By 2010, Stefano Ricci S.p.A. had acquired the Antico Setificio Fiorentino S.r.l., a historic silk-weaving mill located in the Oltrarno area of Florence.

Founding
The Stefano Ricci company was founded in 1972 by Florentine designer and Knight of the Order of Merit for Labour, Stefano Ricci, and his wife Claudia. Their first business location was in the family home on Via dei Niccoli, in Florence; the location remains open as the company's bespoke tailoring atelier. The current CEO is the eponymous Founder's eldest son, Niccolò Ricci, while the Creative Director, Filippo Ricci, is the founder's youngest son.

Boutiques
The brand's first boutique was opened in Shanghai at the Ritz Carlton hotel in 1993, introducing the brand to the Chinese market.
In February 2018 Stefano Ricci inaugurated its 60th monobrand boutique in Hong Kong, located in The Peninsula Hotel. Other flagship stores followed, including Beverly Hills(2001), New York (2005), Florence and Milan(2009), Moscow and Baku (2013), London (2016), and Vancouver (2018). All Stefano Ricci boutiques are characterised by a use of hand-worked materials such as Californian briar-root wood with brown and black variants, Tuscan travertine, pietra serena, and crocodile leather.

Production
The company's original production was based on Italian handmade ties, with the first commercial collection debuting at Pitti Uomo in 1974.

Today, Stefano Ricci S.p.A. produces 100% Made in Italy goods, including the design, manufacture and finishing of merchandise. The company produces couture shirts, handmade ties, suits, casualwear, sportswear, outerwear, skiwear, footwear, leather goods, small leather goods, eyewear, cufflinks, fragrances, wine, writing instruments, porcelain, crystalware, fine linens, and furniture.

The company has a specialized internal workshop for goldsmiths and silversmiths, who create precious belt buckles, hardware for leather goods, and home items, all using traditional Florentine goldsmith traditions.

Unsold merchandise is destroyed each year so that no items are offered to the market at reduced prices or within outlets.

Brand Identity
Stefano Ricci S.p.A. makes use of the eagle as an emblematic trait for the brand, which is found on merchandise as well as the store mannequins which display bronze eagle heads.

The company engages philanthropically with the city of Florence; in 2012 it donated lighting for the Loggia dei Lanzi in Piazza della Signoria, in 2013 it funded the restoration of historic volumes on the Art of Silk and the Art of Wool from the Florence State Archive, and in 2014 it donated new lighting for the Ponte Vecchio.

The company has partnered with Florence's museums for fashion events. Stefano Ricci S.p.A. remains the first and only company to have had a fashion show inside of the Galleria degli Uffizi (2012, 40th Anniversary event); the SR Junior line was launched with a fashion show within the Museo dell’Opera del Duomo; and the Sala Bianca within the Palazzo Pitti was reopened to use for fashion during the company's 45th Anniversary event in 2017.

Charity
Stefano Ricci S.p.A. and the Antico Setificio Fiorentino S.r.l have supported the Andrea Bocelli Foundation and the Mohamed Alì Parkinson Center by hosting galas during the annual Celebrity Fight Night event; the most recent were located in the cloisters of Santa Croce, Florence, in 2016, and at the Palazzo Colonna, Rome, in 2017.

See also 

 Italian fashion
 Made in Italy

References

Further reading

External links 

 

Clothing brands of Italy
Fashion accessory brands
High fashion brands
Italian suit makers
Clothing companies established in 1972
Companies based in Florence
Culture in Florence
Italian companies established in 1972
1972 establishments in Italy
1970s fashion
1980s fashion
1990s fashion
2000s fashion
2010s fashion